Südlohn is a municipality in the district of Borken in the northwestern part of North Rhine-Westphalia, Germany. It is located right at the border with the Netherlands, approx. 10 km east of Winterswijk. It consists of the villages Südlohn and Oeding.

References

Borken (district)